Saprolegniales is an order of freshwater mould.

References

 
Heterokont orders